Funai is a Japanese consumer electronics company.

Funai or FUNAI may also refer to:

Places and jurisdictions
 Funai District, Kyoto, Japan
 Funai Domain, Edo-period domain in Bungo Province, Kyushu, Japan
 Funai Castle, centre of Funai Domain
 Diocese of Funai, Catholic diocese founded in 1588 in the domain (suppressed circa 1660; precursor of Otai)

People with the surname
 Teruo Funai (born 1938), Japanese long-distance runner

Other uses
 FUNAI (Fundação Nacional dos Povos Indígenas; National Indigenous People Foundation), a Brazilian governmental protection agency for indigenous Brazilian interests and culture

Japanese-language surnames